Jerusalem Commands is a historical fiction novel by English author Michael Moorcock published by Jonathan Cape in 1992. It is the third in the Pyat Quartet tetralogy, preceded by The Laughter of Carthage and followed by The Vengeance of Rome. The novel takes place between World War I and World War II, and in it, Colonel Pyat travels from Hollywood to Casablanca, to Alexandria and travels across the Sahara.

External links

1992 British novels
Novels by Michael Moorcock
Fiction with unreliable narrators
Jonathan Cape books